A prison uniform is a set of standardized clothing worn by prisoners. It usually includes visually distinct clothes worn to indicate the wearer is a prisoner, in clear distinction from civil clothing.

Prison uniforms are intended to make prisoners instantly identifiable, limit risks through concealed objects and prevent injuries through undesignated clothing objects. A prison uniform can also spoil attempts of escape, as prison uniforms typically use a design and color scheme that is easily noticed and identified even at a greater distance. Wearing a prison uniform is typically done only reluctantly and is often perceived as stigmatizing, and as an invasion into the autonomy of decision.

The Standard Minimum Rules for the Treatment of Prisoners first adopted in 1955 and amended in 2015 as "Mandela Rules" prohibit degrading or humiliating clothing, requiring in Rule 19 that:
Every prisoner who is not allowed to wear his or her own clothing shall be provided with an outfit of clothing suitable for the climate and adequate to keep him or her good health. Such clothing shall in no manner be degrading or humiliating.
All clothing shall be clean and kept in proper condition. Underclothing shall be changed and washed as often as necessary for the maintenance of hygiene.
In exceptional circumstances, whenever a prisoner is removed outside the prison for an authorized purpose, he or she shall be allowed to wear his or her own clothing or other inconspicuous clothing.

Early prison uniforms
During the Victorian era when prison sentences of prolonged durance were implemented in the judicial system of several countries, actual garments were conceived to be worn specifically by prison inmates, which developed to the various types of prison uniforms presently in use.

Prison uniform by nation

Romania
All incarcerated people in Romania wear their own clothes. Until around 2007, when Romania joined the EU, prison uniforms existed, but there is few sources on whether they were compulsory for all people behind bars, compulsory for all convicts, used by some detainees, used by some convicts, or used by both some detainees and convicts. It is however known that a short time after the collapse of communism (in 1992) uniforms were compulsory for all people behind bars. It is known that the Aiud prison required inmates to wear khaki uniforms and inmates serving a life sentence wore orange uniforms. As for other prisons, many probably also used khaki uniforms as human rights website shows inmates in khaki uniforms at Rahova prison.

Poland
While prison uniforms are used for both convicts and detainees, they are not compulsory. The policies are similar to those in Germany. Some prisons do not use them at all, some prisons use them only for some inmates (depending on conviction of crime or behavior), and some prisons make uniforms compulsory. Minimum security prisons are encouraged to not use prison uniforms and maximum security prisons are encouraged to use them, however this all varies as some inmates incarcerated for small crimes do wear uniforms and some inmates incarcerated for serious crimes do not wear them. Uniforms are almost always and even possibly always worn on top of civilian clothes.  Usually on all security levels the uniform is a green button down jacket worn on top of civilian clothes with green jacket pants but some inmates in maximum security prisons and non-serious criminals who are badly misbehaved sometimes wear orange or red instead of green.

Germany

During the Nazi period of Germany, interned people in the concentration camp system were often made to wear prisoner's uniforms.
In today's Germany, inmates may wear regular civilian clothing in some prisons. In other prisons clothing issued by the prison is compulsory. If a prisoner cannot afford to have his own clothing cleaned and/or replaced, they may be issued with clothing. There are also facilities with no prison uniforms.

The prison uniforms are officially referred to as Anstaltskleidung (literally: “institutional clothing”), not as “uniforms”. They are usually similar to the type of clothing generally worn for manual work, and not necessarily recognizable as prison clothing. When prisoners are allowed to temporarily leave prison, they may generally wear private clothing to avoid being recognized as prisoners.

United Kingdom

19th century
In the United Kingdom, prison uniforms formerly consisted of a white jacket, trousers and pillbox hat, all stamped with the broad arrow to denote crown property.
The idea of covering the uniforms of Penal Servitude prisoners with the broad arrow was first introduced by Sir Edmund Du Cane in the 1870s after his appointment as Chairman of Convict Directors and Surveyor-General of Prisons. Du Cane considered the broad arrow to be a hindrance to escape and also a mark of shame. It was certainly unpopular with the convicts. “All over the whole clothing were hideous black impressions of the Broad Arrow”, wrote one prisoner. Another considered the “hideous dress” to be “the most extraordinary garb I had ever seen outside a pantomime”. Men sent to public-works prisons were issued with boots. One prisoner, Jeremiah O'Donovan Rossa, left this description: “Fully fourteen pounds in weight. I put them on and the weight of them served to fasten me to the ground. It was not that alone, but the sight of the impression they left on the gutter as you looked at the footprints of those who walked before you, struck terror to your heart. There was the felon’s brand of the ‘broad arrow’ impressed on the soil by every footstep…the nails in the soles of your boots and shoes were hammered in an arrow shape, so that whatever ground you trod you left traces that Government property had travelled over it.” The broad arrow markings were used until 1922.

21st century
Currently prisoners are clothed in a standard issue prison uniform, which consists of a blue t-shirt, a grey jumper (sweater), and grey soft trousers (jogging bottoms/pants). All male prisoners must wear the uniform during the first two weeks of their sentence, and are then entitled to wear some of their own clothes if they choose to after obtaining a higher enhanced reward level, for doing things such as performing their prison chores and keeping good behavior, etc. This does not include dangerous criminals, usually those held in Category A maximum security prisons, who are assessed as having a high escape attempt risk; they are required to wear yellow and green boiler suits with the words 'HM PRISON' ('HM' standing for His/Her Majesty) printed on the back in black capital lettering on a permanent basis whilst in custody. This uniform is known as an "Escape list suit". Such prisoners are also handcuffed and sometimes fitted with a leather belly chain when moved outside of prison to places such as court buildings. Remanded prisoners in the UK who have not yet been sentenced may wear their own clothing. Prisoners in Category D open prisons can also wear their own clothing to prepare them for their eventual release, but not anything that resembles a prison officer's uniform. All non-prison issue personal clothing sent in must be approved before it can be used by prisoners.

Although female prisoners are not subject to the same rules and do not have to wear uniform under government legislation, individual female prisons are able to set their own regulations regarding uniforms. Many female prisons still stock prison issue clothing items similar to those worn by male prisoners for women who don't have clothing of their own, and have regulations regarding what items of clothing can and cannot be worn are similar to those upheld by male prisons.

United States
To make escape more difficult, prison uniforms in the United States often consist of a distinctive orange jumpsuit with short sleeves or set of scrubs with a white T-shirt underneath, as it is difficult for an escaped inmate to avoid recognition and recapture in such distinctive attire. Originally a horizontal white and black bee-striped uniform and hat was used.

Striped prison uniforms commonly used in the 19th century (the Auburn system) began to be abolished in parts of the United States early in the 20th century because their continued use as a badge of shame was considered undesirable.

Throughout most of the twentieth century, attitudes were different towards philosophies of rehabilitation. Fair treatment of prisoners and a growing number of non-violent, working-class offenders prompted such a change in attitudes, and clothing and conditions changed to serve the concept of rehabilitation rather than punishment. As a result, work clothes were introduced, perhaps because of the concept of honest labor helping to turn an inmate into an honest citizen. Blue jeans and light blue denim or chambray work shirts became the norm, a tradition still followed in some state prison systems today. In federal prisons, this concept was introduced in the form of khaki pants and shirts, still in use.

Near the end of the 20th century, first orange jumpsuits, then orange scrubs, became commonplace. In many cases, prison uniforms are better suited to the comfort and durability required for long term inmates, and these new uniforms are used mostly in local jails for short term inmates and offenders awaiting trial or transportation to a more permanent facility. Striped uniforms, in general, have made a significant comeback into the jail and prison system for a variety of reasons, such as mistaking jumpsuit-clad workers as inmates. The orange jump suit has also become an international symbol of abuse and propagandized by groups such as ISIS. False reporting of people in similar clothing has become a problem in some counties, so many have switched back to using striped uniforms (mostly orange and white) due to the unambiguous nature of these garments being associated with inmates.

In the 21st century, hot pink uniforms were introduced in some facilities. The reason for that is on the one hand visibility, on the other hand wearing hot pink clothes is meant to be a disincentive especially for male inmates who don't like pink.

Finland 
Prisoners are given prison uniforms upon arrival to the prison; they may wear their own clothes instead, provided that the prisoner maintains the clothes themselves. Prisoners can be restricted from wearing their own clothes by the prison based on the prison order or occupational safety. Finnish prison uniforms date back to 1998 and are washed in a central laundry in Hämeenlinna. They are red and grey.

Other countries 
In South Korea prison uniforms are also compulsory, often using a khaki color scheme.

See also
 Prison officer
 Prisoner's rights
 Detention (imprisonment)
 Straitjacket
 Physical restraints
 Barefoot

References

 
 
 
Penal imprisonment
Penology
Uniforms